Ex-Sensitive is the second album by Scottish/American singer Ben Jelen and is his first release on Linda Perry's Custard Records. The first single, "Where Do We Go", failed to chart in the US.

Track listing 
 "Pulse"
 "Where Do We Go"
 "Ex-Sensitive"
 "Counting Down"
 "Just a Little"
 "Not My Plan"
 "Papa, Here I Go"
 "Vulnerable"
 "Mr. Philosopher"
 "Short of the World"
 "Wreckage"
 "The Other Side"
 "What Have We Done"

Production

 Produced and engineered by Linda Perry at Kung Fu Gardens, North Hollywood, California
 Right-hand man and Pro Tools engineer: Andrew Chavez 
 Assisted by Kristofer Kaufman 
 All tracks mixed by Ian Lehrfeld and Damon Fox except "Counting Down" and "Wreckage" mixed by Bill Botrell
 Mixes assisted by Andrew Chavez & Kristofer Kaufman 
 All strings arranged by Eric Gorfain and performed by The Section Quartet

2007 albums
Ben Jelen albums
Albums produced by Linda Perry